Hartney Airport was located  south-southwest of Hartney, Manitoba, Canada.

References

Defunct airports in Manitoba